Aaron Abrams (born 12 May 1978) is a Canadian actor and writer, who has worked in both film and television.

Born in Toronto, Abrams has appeared as a regular on several series, including Hannibal, Blindspot, The State Within, Slings and Arrows, and Runaway. He also has had supporting roles in dramas Amelia with Hilary Swank, and Flash of Genius with Greg Kinnear. He has also had several comedic roles (Jesus Henry Christ, Take This Waltz, Children Ruin Everything). He wrote and starred in the films The Go-Getters and Young People Fucking  for which he won a Canadian Comedy Award. Abrams also wrote and produced The Lovebirds starring Issa Rae and Kumail Nanjiani.

Personal life
Born in Toronto, Canada, Abrams now lives in Los Angeles.

Filmography

Film

Television

References

External links

 

1978 births
21st-century Canadian male actors
Canadian male film actors
Canadian male television actors
Canadian male voice actors
Living people
Male actors from Toronto
21st-century Canadian screenwriters
Canadian male screenwriters
Canadian Comedy Award winners